Georges Lentz is a contemporary composer and sound artist, born in Luxembourg in 1965 and that country's internationally best known composer. Since 1990, he has been living in Sydney, Australia. Despite his relatively small output and his reclusiveness, he is also considered one of Australia's leading composers. His music is inspired by the starry night sky in the Australian Outback and by Aboriginal art. 

He is the creator of the Cobar Sound Chapel.

Life
Born in Luxembourg City on 22 October 1965, Lentz grew up in the Luxembourg town of Echternach. He studied at the Luxembourg Conservatoire and later at the Paris Conservatoire (1982–1986) and the Musikhochschule Hannover (1986–1990). In 1989, he began working on a cycle of compositions titled Caeli enarrant.... His music is being recognised increasingly around the world, with performances at the Berlin Philharmonie, the Vienna Musikverein and Konzerthaus, Concertgebouw Amsterdam, Wigmore Hall London, Carnegie Hall New York, Kennedy Center Washington, Suntory Hall Tokyo, Sydney Opera House. Many orchestras have performed his works, including the BBC Symphony Orchestra in London, BBC National Orchestra of Wales, Hallé Orchestra of Manchester, Deutsches Symphonieorchester Berlin, Bamberger Symphoniker, Kölner Philharmoniker, Düsseldorfer Symphoniker, Netherlands Radio Symphony Orchestra, ORF Symphony Orchestra in Vienna, Warsaw Philharmonic, St. Louis Symphony Orchestra, Tokyo Metropolitan Symphony Orchestra, New Japan Philharmonic, Sydney Symphony Orchestra and Melbourne Symphony Orchestra among others. His orchestral work Guyuhmgan, from part VII of the cycle Mysterium was the foremost recommended work at UNESCO's 2002 International Rostrum of Composers in Paris. His compositions include a work for viola, orchestra and electronics called Monh written for Tabea Zimmermann, as well as Ingwe for solo electric guitar, written for the Australian guitarist Zane Banks.

Being given to self-doubt and reclusiveness, Lentz rarely publishes new works and rarely accepts commissions. He is said to retire to an abbey (Clervaux Abbey in Luxembourg) or the Australian desert to find inspiration and compose, and only very rarely gives interviews. Lentz didn't attend the 2009 APRA Classical Music Awards ceremony at the Sydney Opera House to accept that year's top prize for Best Composition by an Australian Composer, instead sending guitarist friend Zane Banks to pick up the award and read out his acceptance speech (21 September 2009). A 40-minute documentary about the birth of Ingwe which appeared on YouTube in May 2010 shows Lentz for a total of about 30 seconds. In May 2022, the following note appeared on the composer's website: "About a year ago, I was persuaded to agree to interviews in the lead-up to the opening of the new Cobar Sound Chapel. I have pushed myself to go along with media requests I was very uncomfortable with. This has led me to a state of total mental exhaustion. I therefore regret to say there will be no more interviews."

In the 2012/13 season, Lentz was in residence at the Internationales Künstlerhaus Villa Concordia in Bamberg, Germany and collaborated with Jonathan Nott and the Bamberger Symphoniker.

In January 2015, a new orchestral work, Jerusalem (after Blake), taking its inspiration  from Jerusalem by William Blake, was premiered by the Luxembourg Philharmonic Orchestra. In May 2015, a portrait concert of Lentz's music by the Munich Chamber Orchestra at the Pinakothek der Moderne included the world premiere of the definitive version of Birrung (1997-2014) for 11 strings. In November 2016, the final version of Jerusalem was premiered at Wien Modern.

In April 2022, a major new sound art project, the Cobar Sound Chapel, opened in Cobar in Outback New South Wales. It is a purpose-built venue to permanently house the 4-channel projection of Lentz's digital string quartet, the 372-minute / 24 hour composition String Quartet(s) (2000-2022), as well as the venue for a new annual String Quartet Festival Weekend. The Cobar Sound Chapel was designed by Pritzker Prize-winning Australian architect Glenn Murcutt in collaboration with the composer, with its architecture reflecting rhythmic and structural patterns found in String Quartet(s).

A new violin concerto, "...to beam in distant heavens...", is due to be premiered by German soloist Arabella Steinbacher with the Sydney Symphony Orchestra at the Sydney Opera House in April 2023.

Lentz's music is published by Universal Edition in Vienna.

Music

Lentz's music expresses his fascination with astronomy as well as his love of the Australian Outback and Aboriginal art (in particular the works of Kathleen Petyarre), and reflects his spiritual and existential beliefs, questions and doubts.

The Vale of Glamorgan Festival (UK), where Lentz was a featured composer in 2006, introduced his music as "...an awestruck and almost fearful response to the beauties and mysteries of the universe; a massive, personal creative undertaking from which this intense, almost obsessive composer is painstakingly extracting concert works...a unique voice whose music is genuinely moving despite its brittle austerity and unearthliness, and captures some of the most evocative silences imaginable."

Lentz's music shows the influence of the French Spectralists and, to some degree, the New Complexity movement (unusual instrumental combinations, extended playing techniques etc.). It is often soft, fluctuates between polyphonic intricacy and fragile monody and sometimes contains extended silences.

Lentz's scores of recent years (Mysterium) are written in an unusual rhythmic system, where each bar contains four beats, but the beats can be of different lengths. While it is not clear why Lentz has adopted this idiosyncratic system, the textures and colours (occasionally with delicate layers of computer-generated sounds) superimposed over the top of these rigid "grids" often give it a shimmering or 'twinkling' quality.

Another feature particularly of his orchestral works is a sense of harmony incorporating both microtonality and, now and then, an austere sense of 'twisted' tonality, with the occasional harmonic progression fleetingly reminiscent of Schumann or Bruckner. However, these chorale-like fragments are always brief and buried in the texture of the music, giving the impression of something "long forgotten".

Lentz has said that in recent years he has been increasingly interested in, and influenced by, the practices of musical improvisation, music technology, sound art and digital art.

Ingwe is a 60-minute work for solo electric guitar, possibly the longest solo composition ever written for the instrument. It contrasts sharply, in many ways, with Lentz's prior music and takes the electric guitar into dimensions previously unexplored in a 'classical' context. Ingwe also contains, for the first time in Lentz's output, a short section that relinquishes strict control over the musical material and gives some improvisational freedom to the performer.

Both Jerusalem (after Blake) and String Quartet(s) testify to Lentz's love of William Blake's visionary epic Jerusalem the Emanation of the Giant Albion.  Because of its vast cyclical structure, Lentz's work has been described by British musicologist Chris Dench as "almost proustian" in nature.

In the final analysis Lentz's music, born from "total silence and radical isolation – at the very real risk of hearing nothing at all" (composer's website), seems to be torn between feelings of awe and an over-riding struggle with spiritual doubt and existential loneliness.

Principal works

Caeli enarrant... (1989 to date)

Recordings 

•"Caeli enarrant..." III, "Caeli enarrant..." IV, Birrung & Nguurraa

Ensemble 24 / Matthew Coorey

•Ingwe

Zane Banks

•Ngangkar & Guyuhmgan

Sydney Symphony Orchestra / Edo de Waart, ABC Classics

•Ngangkar, Guyuhmgan & Monh

Tabea Zimmermann / Orchestre Philharmonique du Luxembourg / Emilio Pomarico

Awards
Paul Lowin Orchestral Prize 1997 – "Caeli enarrant..." IUNESCO International Rostrum of Composers, Paris, 2002: Top Recommended Composition – GuyuhmganAPRA Awards of 2009: Best Composition by an Australian Composer – Monh''

References

External links 
 Georges Lentz's website
 Georges Lentz biography and works on the UE website (publisher)
 Georges Lentz at Villa Concordia, Bamberg

1965 births
Living people
20th-century classical composers
20th-century Australian male musicians
20th-century Australian musicians
21st-century classical composers
21st-century classical violinists
21st-century Australian male musicians
21st-century Australian musicians
Australian classical composers
Australian classical violinists
Australian male classical composers
Luxembourgian composers
Luxembourgian emigrants to Australia
Male classical violinists
APRA Award winners
Hochschule für Musik, Theater und Medien Hannover alumni